Mordellistena aequinoctialis is a species of beetle in the genus Mordellistena of the family Mordellidae. It was discovered in 1891.

References

aequinoctialis
Beetles described in 1891